Overbeck's Museum and Garden is an Edwardian house and 2.75 hectare (7 acre) garden at Sharpitor, Salcombe, Devon, England. It is named after its last private owner Otto Christop Joseph Gerhardt Ludwig Overbeck (1860–1937).

Until 2014 the house was divided between a museum and a youth hostel. YHA Salcombe closed in 2014 when the agreement between the National Trust and The Youth Hostel Association broke down. The part of the house formerly used as the hostel is currently (2017) unused, and closed to the public.

The museum houses displays of some of Overbeck's inventions and collections of stuffed animals, and exhibitions of model sailing ships and various nautical and shipbuilding tools and effects. There are display photographs of boats and shipwrecks (such as the Herzogin Cecilie). A room in the middle of the house, one of whose entrances is a secret door concealed in the wooden panelling of the room outside, contains a display of dolls' houses, amongst which is placed by staff "Fred the friendly ghost" for child visitors to discover. The museum contains a Polyphon — a large musical box which plays music encoded as holes punched in large sheet-metal discs. There is a collection of discs of popular melodies of the day which are played from time to time during the day when the museum is open. There is also a collection of photographs by Edward Chapman who worked in and photographed Salcombe – including the building of the first house on the site – during the early 20th century. The photographs have been reprinted from the original plates by Chapman's son and his grandson, Chris Chapman, who continues the family photography business in Plymouth. A tea room offers a variety of snacks and delectables, including Devonshire cream teas.

History
The original building on the site was a small villa "Sharpitor" erected by Salcombe builder Albert Stumbles. This was bought in 1901 by Edric Hopkins, who also bought  more of land, creating terraces and planting exotic specimens on the sheltered site. In 1913 the property was bought by Mr and Mrs Vereker who demolished the original house and had the present one built. Otto Overbeck acquired the house in 1928 and lived there until his death in 1937. Wishing the house to be used after his death as "a public park and museum and a Hostel for Youth" Overbeck bequeathed it to the National Trust on condition it be used as such and not as a brothel as so many in the surrounding area became.

References

External links
Overbeck's information at the National Trust
Youth Hostel at Overbeck's

Biographical museums in Devon
Gardens in Devon
Historic house museums in Devon
Houses in Devon
Museums in Devon
National Trust properties in Devon
Salcombe